The Way of the World is a 1916 American silent Feature film directed by Lloyd B. Carleton. The film is based on a play by Clyde Fitch and developed for the screen by F. McGrew Willis. This drama's features Hobart Bosworth, Dorothy Davenport, and Emory Johnson.

The story revolves around Beatrice Farley, who becomes the wife of first-term Governor Walter Croyden. Mrs. Croyden's innocent flirtation with a man from her past, John Nevill, causes a public scandal. The scandal results in her husband nearly losing his bid for a second term in office and the death of the movie's Antagonist.

The film was released on July 3, 1916, by Universal.

Plot
Peter Sturton is a politician and the head of the state political machine. Sturton supports Walter Croydon, a rising young attorney, for the position of Governor of the State. Croyden loves Beatrice Farley, a young society belle, but they have not been formally engaged. Croyden invites Beatrice to accompany him to a social ball. On the evening of the event, Croyden meets Sturton at his club and becomes intoxicated. While still intoxicated, he calls upon Beatrice. She refuses to go with him to the ball. The following day, Croyden returns to see Beatrice and apologizes for his condition of the previous evening. He asks Beatrice to forgive him, professes his love, and asks her to marry him. Beatrice tells Croyden she is making preparations to leave for Europe with Mr. and Mrs. Lake. She promises to give him an answer when she returns.
 John Nevill is a man about town and a friend of Sturton's. Nevill is part of an unhappy marriage, but he and his wife continue to live together. There is little love between them. Nevill makes plans to travel to trip Europe on his own. He tells his wife she can go wherever she wants for her vacation. As the boat is ready to sail, Nevill sees Beatrice bid Croydon goodbye and then board the ship. Beatrice's beauty overwhelms Nevill, and he quickly makes her acquaintance on the ship. He becomes infatuated with her. Nevill resolves to win her love and begins paying constant attention to her. He never reveals he's married. Beatrice and the Lakes come to Monte Carlo, where Nevill is staying, and Nevill, renewing the acquaintance, begins wooing her again. 

While swimming, Beatrice has an accident, but Nevill comes to her rescue and saves her life. Beatrice discovers she loves him in return. Finally, Nevill proposes that they travel to Paris to get married, and Beatrice consents. When they return to the hotel to pack, they encounter friends of Nevill's who have arrived from America. Although Nevill had planned to tell Beatrice he was married, Nevill's friends casually mention his wife is staying in Newport for the Summer and sends her love. Beatrice's world suddenly collapses.

Beatrice is heartbroken and begins packing to return home. She has completely lost her faith in Nevill. Nevill pleads with her to no avail and finally, in a fit of anger, tells her he will not give up on her. He tells her in the future; he will make her love him again. After Beatrice departs, Nevill turns to drink. Word of his drinking reaches Mrs. Nevill, and she comes to him and persuades him to return home. In the meantime, they have elected Walter Croydon as Governor. Upon returning to the states, Beatrice consents to become Croydon's bride, and they marry. Sturton visits the Nevill's and asks them to attend the Governor's Inaugural ball. He tells the Nevill's it will allow them to meet the Governor and his wife. Nevill discovers the Governor's wife is Beatrice, and it awakens his passion. Nevill hatches a deceitful scheme to win Beatrice from Croydon. Beatrice feels the effects of her rejection on Nevill. After listening to Nevill's pleas for forgiveness, Beatrice agrees to be his friend. Nevill becomes a friend of the family. Although they are together often, Croydon suspects no improprieties, and Beatrice feels nothing improper in her friendship with Nevill. Nevill, in the subsequent years, poisons the mind of Croydon with thoughts that his wife is unfaithful.

Time passes, and Croyden is running for reelection. Sturton has had a falling out with the Governor and is opposing him with every weapon in his command. The Croydon's now have a child — a boy a few months old. Mr. Lake goes to Croyden and tells him that the people are talking about of frequency of Nevill being seen with Mrs. Croydon. The Governor dismisses this talk as nothing more than idle gossip.

Nevill, realizing he has planted the seeds of suspicion, now implements the last phase of his plan to convince Croyden to leave his wife. He gives Sturton a paragraph to put in the papers on the day before the election, saying while the Governor has been away securing votes, his wife has been continually in the company of a certain man whom the paper does not mention. After Croyden reads the article in the newspaper, he goes straight to Nevill. Nevill assures him he can trust his wife, and Croyden dismisses the matter.

The day has arrived, and Croydon's baby is about to be christened. The guests are gathering at the church, and Croydon prepares to leave his office. Before he steps out the door, he sees a copy of the newspaper article implying the child's father might not be Croydon but the man Beatrice spends so much of her time with. Overcome with grief, Croydon drinks heavily and then shows up in the middle of the christening. The intoxicated Croydon denounces Beatrice and forbids her to name the boy after him. Croydon then accuses Nevill, mano-a-mano, of being the father of the child. Nevill refuses to deny the charge. Croydon leaves the church, locks himself in his room, and refuses to see Beatrice or even let her explain. After the commotion at the church, Mr. and Mrs. Nevill return home. Mrs. Nevill, convinced of her husband's guilt, tells him she is giving up on this marriage. She declares Beatrice was the woman responsible for his melancholy in Europe. He tells her to go, for he believes Beatrice will come back begging for his forgiveness.

Beatrice is in shock at her husband's reactions. She realizes only Nevill can clear her name and goes to Nevill's home to appeal to him to prove her innocence. Beatrice tells Mrs. Lake where she is going. She arrives at Nevill's house, finding him alone. Nevill believes he has won her back. He insists he'll write a letter clearing her name, but she must pay the price — she must be his, if for no longer than an hour. He writes the letter, then latches the door and confronts her. Beatrice struggles fiercely to preserve her honor and finally, in desperation, grabs a sharp paper-knife and stabs him. She drops the knife to the floor. Croyden has determined where Beatrice has gone and, accompanied by Mrs. Nevill, heads for the Neville House. After arriving at the Nevill estate, Croyden breaks down the door and finds Nevill dying on the floor. Realizing that he is on the verge of death, Nevill reconsiders. He picks up the knife with a trembling hand and tells them for Beatrice's love, and because she has repulsed him, he has attempted suicide. He takes the note clearing Beatrice's name from his pocket and gives it to Croyden. Croyden realizes that this will absolve him in the people's eyes and tip the election in his favor. Nevill begs Beatrice's forgiveness, then collapses, falls weakly back on the floor, and dies. He paid the price of his obsession. It is the "Way of the World."

Cast

Production

Pre-production

Development
According to the book - The Universal Story, Carl Laemmle (-1939) produced around 91 movies in 1916.
Lloyd B. Carleton (–1933) started working for Carl Laemmle in the Fall of 1915. Carleton arrived with impeccable credentials, having directed some 60 films for the likes of Thanhouser, Lubin, Fox, and Selig. 
Between March and December 1916, 44-year-old Lloyd Carleton directed 16 movies for Universal, starting with The Yaqui and ending with The Morals of Hilda. Emory Johnson acted in all 16 of these films. Of Carleton's total 1916 output, 11 were feature films, and the rest were two-reel shorts.

In 1916, Carleton directed 13 films pairing Dorothy Davenport and Emory Johnson. This film would be the sixth in the 13-film series. These totals show Carl Laemmle was clearly giving the Davenport-Johnson pairing one of his elite directors from the working cadre of universal directors to produce the screen chemistry Laemmle was seeking.

Casting
All players in this film were under contract with Universal.
Hobart Bosworth (1867-1943) was  years old when he played the heavy, John Nevill. This film was a radical departure from Bosworth's previous roles. "Heretofore Bosworth has been known to patrons of the films the world over as a leading man with no taint of the heavy about him." When Universal hired Emory Johnson in January 1916, Bosworth took the youngster under his wing. Bosworth and Johnson's first two movies for Universal were the feature-length Westerns – The Yaqui released March 1916 and Two Men of Sandy Bar released in April. Dr. Neighbor would be the first pairing of the  Davenport-Johnson twosome in Carl Laemmle's search for screen chemistry. Later in the year, Emory would make two more films with Bosworth. They would continue collaborating in other films in the coming years. In Bosworth's long cinematic career, he appeared in nearly 300 films.
Dorothy Davenport (1895-1977) was an established star for Universal.  year old Davenport played the flirtatious Beatrice Farley. She had acted in hundreds of movies by the time she starred in this film. The majority of these films were 2-reel shorts, as was the norm in Hollywood's teen years. She had been making movies since 1910. She started dating Wally Reid when she was barely 16, and he was 20. They married in 1913. After her husband died in 1923, she used the name "Mrs. Wallace Reid" in the credits for any project she took part in. Besides being an actress, she would eventually become a film director, producer, and writer.
Emory Johnson (1894-1960) was  Johnson  years old when he starred in this movie as Walter Croyden. In January 1916, Emory signed a contract with Universal Film Manufacturing Company. Carl Laemmle of Universal Film Manufacturing Company thought he saw great potential in Johnson, so he chooses him to be Universal's new leading man. Laemmle's hope was Johnson would become another Wallace Reed. A major part of his plan was to create a movie couple that would sizzle on the silver screen. Laemmle thought Dorothy Davenport and Emory Johnson could create the chemistry he sought. Johnson and Davenport would complete 14 films together. They started with the successful feature production of "Doctor Neighbor" in May 1916 and ended with The Devil's Bondwoman in November 1916. After completing the last movie, Laemmle thought Johnson did not have the screen presence he wanted. He decided not to renew his contract. Johnson would make 17 movies in 1916, including 6 shorts and 11 feature-length Dramas. 1916 would become the second-highest movie output of his entire acting career. Emory acted in 25 films for Universal, mostly dramas with a sprinkling of comedies and westerns.
Gretchen Lederer (1891-1955) was a  year-old actress when she landed this role as Mrs. Nevill, the wife of John Nevill. Lederer was a German actress getting her first start in 1912 with Carl Laemmle.  At the time of this film, she was still a Universal contract actress. She had previously acted in two Bosworth-Johnson projects preceding this movie - The Yaqui and Two Men of Sandy Bar. She would unite with Emory Johnson in the 1916 productions of A Yoke of Gold and The Morals of Hilda.
Adele Farrington (Mrs. Hobart Bosworth) (-1936) was  years old when she played Mrs. Lake. Farrington was also a Universal contract player appearing in 74 films between 1914 and 1926. Although she got her start in movies when she was 47-years-old (1914), Universal cast her mostly in character leads. Many of her roles were acting alongside her husband, Hobart Bosworth, whom she married in 1909 and divorced in 1920. In addition to her roles as an actress, she was also a music composer and writer.
Jack Curtis (1880-1956) was  years old when he acted in this movie. His character was Peter Sturton, a former governor, supporting Croyden's bid for a second term. Curtis appeared in 157 films between 1915 and 1950.

Screenplay
The story was based on the successful play by Clyde Fitch (1865–1909) first shown on the New York stage on November 4, 1901. The story was adapted to the screen by F. McGrew Willis (1891-1957)

Filming
Hobart Bosworth and company along with Director Lloyd Carleton, went to San Diego to shoot exteriors for this film including the scenes aboard a boat. 
The production also had a number of expensive settings including the interiors of clubs, Monte Carlo, the executive mansion, and a church.

Schedule
Although no exact dates are published, according to The Motion Picture News, the film started shooting in February 1916. Shooting continued through April. We do know the film was copyrighted on Jun 8, 1916.

Post production
The theatrical release of this film totaled five reels or 5,000 feet of film. As is often the case, the listed time for this feature-length movie varies. The average time per 1,000-foot 35mm reel varied between ten and fifteen minutes per reel at the time. Thus, the total time for this movie is computed between fifty and seventy-five minutes.

Studios
The interiors were filmed in both San Diego and the studio complex at Universal Studios located at 100 Universal City Plaza in  Universal City, California.Universal both produced and distributed this film.

Release and reception

Official release
The copyright was filed with U.S. Copyright Office and entered into the record as shown:
THE WAY OF THE WORLD. Red Feather.
1916. 5 reels. From the play by Clyde Fitch.
Credits: Producer, L B. Carleton; scenario, F. McGrew Willis.
© Universal Film Mfg. Co., Inc.; 8Jun16;
LP8458
This film was officially released on July 3, 1916.

Advertising
Based on an American Film Institute standard, films with a running time of forty-five minutes or longer are considered feature films. In 1915, feature films were becoming more the trend in Hollywood.  In 1916, Universal formed a three-tier branding system for their releases. Universal films decided to label their films according to the size of their budget and status. Universal, unlike the top-tier studios, did not own any theaters to market its feature films. By branding their product, Universal gave theater owners and audiences a quick reference guide.  Branding would help theater owners make judgments for films they were about to lease and help fans decide which movies they wanted to see.

Universal released three different types of feature motion pictures:
 Red feather Photoplays – low-budget feature films
 Bluebird Photoplays – mainstream feature release and more ambitious productions
 Jewel – prestige motion pictures featuring high budgets using prominent actors

This film was the 23rd release carrying the designation of Universal’s "Red Feather" brand.

Reviews
The movie critic's reviews of the photoplay were mixed.

Critical Response
In the June 24, 1916 issue of the Motion Picture News,  movie critic Peter Milne reviewed the film:

It makes the entertainment of the average sort. Mr. Bosworth has not delineated his Nevill with the precision and skill that we have become accustomed to. Perhaps it is because he has almost always played the hero. He gives an entirely too likable impression during the first phases of the picture. The cropping out of the villainous characteristics in the final episodes hardly jibes correctly with the earlier impression gained from his acting.

In the July 1, 1916 issue of The Moving Picture World, the movie review by critic Robert C. McElravy:

The interrupted wedding has long been a favorite theme in drama, but it cannot compare with the interrupted christening in this release.  It is the climax of a long, carefully handled string of situations and gets over with strength and conviction. The performance Is a smooth and enjoyable one throughout. The production, free from padding, tells a well-rounded story and is altogether successful.

In the July 8, 1916 issue of The Moving Picture World, the movie critic observes:

The story moves off slowly, but with constantly increasing interest.  An interrupted christening, in which the jealous husband claims another is the child's father, makes the chief scene. This proves highly dramatic and is presented with conviction. The offering as a whole is well handled and tells a story of love and political intrigue. A satisfying subject.

Preservation status

A report created by film historian and archivist David Pierce for the Library of Congress claims:
75% of original silent-era films have perished.
14% of the 10,919 silent films released by major studios exist in their original 35mm or other formats.
11% survive in full-length foreign versions or on film formats of lesser image quality. Many silent-era films did not survive for reasons as explained on this Wikipedia page.

According to the Library of Congress, all known copies of this film are lost.

Gallery

References

External links

Katchmer, George A. A Biographical Dictionary of Silent Film Western Actors and Actresses, McFarland, 2002, p. 204.
Holmstrom, John. The Moving Picture Boy: An International Encyclopaedia from 1895 to 1995, Norwich, Michael Russell, 1996.
List of Universal Pictures films (1912–1919)
Universal Pictures
List of American films of 1916

1916 lost films
1916 drama films
1916 films
American black-and-white films
Lost American films
Silent American drama films
Universal Pictures films
Films directed by Lloyd B. Carleton
1910s English-language films